The George C. Pimentel Award in Chemical Education recognizes "outstanding contributions to chemical education." It is a national award, given annually by the American Chemical Society and sponsored by Cengage Learning and the ACS Division of Chemical Education. The award is named for George C. Pimentel, an American chemist and chemical educator who taught at the University of California, Berkeley. Prior to 1989, the award was named the ACS Award in Chemical Education.

Past recipients
Source: American Chemical Society

See also

 List of chemistry awards

References

Awards of the American Chemical Society